The Ground Launched Small Diameter Bomb (GLSDB) is a weapon made by Boeing and the Saab Group, who modified Boeing's GBU-39 Small Diameter Bomb (SDB) with the addition of a rocket motor. Initial testing began in 2015. The weapon is launched from ground-based missile systems such as the M270 Multiple Launch Rocket System and M142 HIMARS.

Design

Boeing proposed a special adapter case to use an M26 rocket to launch the SDB. After the rocket motor launches it to a high enough altitude and speed, the wings would deploy and glide the bomb to its target. The company believed it could fill a gap for long-range precision fires while using its smaller warhead to save larger rocket munitions for strategic targets. While typical rockets from multiple launch rocket systems (MLRS) follow a ballistic trajectory, the rocket-launched SDB can be launched to altitude and glide on a selected trajectory. 

Boeing and Saab Group conducted three successful GLSDB tests in February 2015. The system utilizes an existing weapon paired with a stockpiled rocket motor, while maintaining the loadout on a rocket artillery system. Unlike traditional artillery weapons, the GLSDB offers 360-degree coverage for high and low angles of attack, flying around terrain to hit targets on the back of mountains, or circling back around to a target behind the launch vehicle.

The SDB and rocket motor separated at altitude and the bomb used a semi-active laser (SAL) seeker to track and engage the target. A 2019 test extended this range to  against a target at sea.

The cost is undisclosed, however the SDB used in GLSDB has a cost of $40,000 (FY 2005)., or $60,000 (FY 2022)

The purpose in developing the weapons was to offer poorer countries the strike capacity of more expensive and advanced air forces. Jim Leary, director of global sales for Boeing, told reporters in 2019: “It really fits across a broader customer set because we’re taking an existing capability, maximizing it and creating an opportunity [for countries] that don’t have the ability to have a robust air force,”

Use in combat
On 3 February 2023, the United States government announced an aid package for Ukraine as part of assistance during the 2022 Russian invasion of Ukraine that would include the GLSDB which will be used in the Ukraine-operated HIMARS to hit Russian targets that had been moved out of GMLRS range. This will mark the weapon's first export and use in combat. However, since the weapon is not part of the U.S. military inventory and can not be launched from current Ukrainian equipment, it is estimated it could take up to nine months for Boeing and the U.S. government to agree on the terms of the contract and perform necessary retrofits on ground launchers.

Operators

Ukrainian Armed Forces (planned for late 2023)

References

Guided bombs of the United States
Boeing
Saab
Military equipment introduced in the 2010s
Fire-and-forget weapons
Post–Cold War weapons of Sweden
Post–Cold War weapons of the United States